Yankee Rose may refer to:
 Yankee Rose (band), a Los Angeles-based rock band in the 1970s and 1980s
 "Yankee Rose" (song), a 1986 song by David Lee Roth